Pseudoecteinomyces is a genus of fungi in the family Euceratomycetaceae. A monotypic genus, it contains the single species Pseudoecteinomyces zuphiicola.

References

External links
Index Fungorum

Laboulbeniomycetes
Monotypic Laboulbeniomycetes genera